Girolamo Piccolomini, seniore was a Roman Catholic prelate who served as Bishop of Pienza (1498–1510) and Bishop of Montalcino (1498–1510).

Biography
On 14 March 1498, Girolamo Piccolomini was appointed during the papacy of Pope Alexander VI as both Bishop of Pienza and Bishop of Montalcino.
He served as Bishop of Pienza and Bishop of Montalcino until his resignation in favor of his son of the same name, Girolamo Piccolomini (junior), on 9 Dec 1510.

References

External links and additional sources
 (for Chronology of Bishops) 
 (for Chronology of Bishops) 
 (for Chronology of Bishops) 
 (for Chronology of Bishops) 

15th-century Italian Roman Catholic bishops
16th-century Italian Roman Catholic bishops
Bishops appointed by Pope Alexander VI